Rönnlund is a Swedish surname. Notable people with the surname include:

Anna Rosling Rönnlund, Swedish designer
Assar Rönnlund (1935–2011), Swedish cross-country skier
Ulla-Karin Rönnlund (born 1977), Swedish football goalkeeper

Swedish-language surnames